Merrick Butte is a butte located in Monument Valley and is part of the Monument Valley Navajo Tribal Park, similar to its neighbors West and East Mitten Buttes just to the north.

References

External links
 

Buttes of Arizona
Landforms of Navajo County, Arizona